Bobo Forro is a village in the north-eastern part of São Tomé Island in São Tomé and Príncipe, part of Mé-Zóchi District. Its population is 715 (2012 census). It lies 3 km southwest of the city centre of the capital São Tomé, and 4 km northeast of Trindade. The adjacent village in the Água Grande District is also called Bobo Forro.

Population history

References

Populated places in Mé-Zóchi District